Draperia is a monotypic genus of plants which includes the single species Draperia systyla, known by the common name violet draperia. This small perennial wildflower is endemic to California. There, it grows in woodlands and rocky slopes in high mountains.. Its leaves, flowers, and fruits are hairy. The flowers are funnel-shaped and generally light pink to lavender in color.

References

External links 
Jepson Manual Treatment
Photo gallery

Hydrophylloideae
Endemic flora of California
Flora of the Sierra Nevada (United States)
Monotypic asterid genera
Boraginaceae genera
Flora without expected TNC conservation status